is a Japanese sprinter. He competed in the men's 4 × 100 metres relay at the 1964 Summer Olympics.

References

External links
 

1933 births
Living people
Place of birth missing (living people)
Japanese male sprinters
Olympic male sprinters
Olympic athletes of Japan
Athletes (track and field) at the 1964 Summer Olympics
Japan Championships in Athletics winners
Universiade medalists in athletics (track and field)
Universiade silver medalists for Japan
20th-century Japanese people